The British pre-decimal halfpenny, (pronounced ), historically also known as the obol and once abbreviated ob. Originally the halfpenny was minted in copper, but after 1860 it was minted in bronze. In the run-up to decimalisation, it ceased to be legal tender from 31 July 1969 (although halfpennies dated 1970 were minted as part of a final pre-decimal commemorative set). The halfpenny featured two different designs on its reverse during its years in circulation. From 1672 until 1936 the image of Britannia appeared on the reverse, and from 1937 onwards the image of the Golden Hind appeared. Like all British coinage, it bore the portrait of the monarch on the obverse.

"Halfpenny" was colloquially written ha'penny, and "d" was spoken as "a penny ha’penny"  or three ha'pence . "Halfpenny" is a rare example of a word in the English language that has a silent 'f'.

Before Decimal Day in 1971, sterling used the Carolingian monetary system, under which the largest unit was a pound divided into 20 shillings, each of 12 pence. Each penny was further divided into 4 farthings, thus a pound contained 480 halfpennies and a shilling contained 24 halfpennies.

Design

The original reverse of the bronze version of the coin, designed by Leonard Charles Wyon, is a seated Britannia, holding a trident, with the words  to either side. Issues before 1895 also feature a lighthouse to Britannia's left and a ship to her right. Various minor adjustments to the level of the sea depicted around Britannia, and the angle of her trident were also made over the years. Some issues feature toothed edges, while others feature beading.

Over the years, various different obverses were used. Edward VII, George V, George VI and Elizabeth II each had a single obverse for halfpennies produced during their respective reigns. Over the long reign of Queen Victoria two different obverses were used, but the short reign of Edward VIII meant no halfpennies bearing his likeness were ever issued.

During Victoria's reign, the halfpenny was first issued with the so-called 'bun head', or 'draped bust' of Queen Victoria on the obverse. The inscription around the bust read . This was replaced in 1895 by the 'old head', or 'veiled bust'. The inscription on these coins read .

Coins issued during the reign of Edward VII feature his likeness and bear the inscription . Similarly, those issued during the reign of George V feature his likeness and bear the inscription .

A halfpenny of King Edward VIII (1936) does exist, dated 1937, but technically it is a pattern coin i.e. one produced for official approval; it would probably have been due to receive this approval at about the time that the King abdicated.

The pattern coin of Edward VIII and regular issue halfpennies of George VI and Elizabeth II feature a redesigned reverse displaying Sir Francis Drake's ship the Golden Hind.

George VI issue coins feature the inscription  before 1949, and  thereafter. Unlike the penny, halfpennies were minted throughout the early reign of Elizabeth II, bearing the inscription  in 1953, and  thereafter.

Mintages

Terminology
Ha’porth: British English i.e. 'halfpenny-worth' or 'halfpennyworth' pronounced .

In literal use usually written out in full although still never pronounced phonetically: e.g. "A halfpennyworth of chips." In figurative use usually said disparagingly: e.g. "I've been dying for somebody with a ha’porth of wit and intelligence to talk to." "…and saying it doesn't make a halfpennyworth of difference!" (from Alan Bennett's A lady of Letters, written and produced in 1987, some sixteen years after decimalisation and three years after the New Halfpenny—(i.e. the decimal p)—had been demonetised and withdrawn from circulation, thus further illustrating the continued traditional or idiomatic two-syllable pronunciation). Also used in the once common phrase: "daft ha’porth."

See also

 Shove ha'penny

References

External links
Halfpenny (Pre-decimal), Coin Type from United Kingdom – Online Coin Club

Coins of Great Britain
Pre-decimalisation coins of the United Kingdom
Coins of the United Kingdom